Scopula reaumuraria is a moth of the family Geometridae. It is found in south-eastern Spain and near Cadiz.

The wingspan is about 17 mm.

Taxonomy
The species was formerly considered a synonym of Scopula pratana.

References

External links
 

Moths described in 1864
reaumuraria
Moths of Europe